
Gmina Radków is a rural gmina (administrative district) in Włoszczowa County, Świętokrzyskie Voivodeship, in south-central Poland.

Villages
Gmina Radków contains the villages and settlements of Bałków, Bieganów, Brzeście, Chycza, Dzierzgów, Kossów, Krasów, Kwilina, Nowiny-Dębnik, Ojsławice, Radków, Skociszewy, Sulików and Świerków.

Neighbouring gminas
Gmina Radków is bordered by the gminas of Moskorzew, Nagłowice, Oksa, Secemin, Szczekociny and Włoszczowa.

References
Polish official population figures 2006

Radkow
Włoszczowa County